MCQ may refer to

 McQ, a 1974 famous crime drama 
 McQ Inc, an American defense company based in Pennsylvania
 Mathematical Citation Quotient, a measure of the impact of a mathematics journal
 Multiple choice question
 Malvern College Qingdao
 IATA code for Miskolc Airport
 McQ, a clothing line from Alexander McQueen (brand)